The Melanconidaceae are a family of fungi in the order Diaporthales, class Sordariomycetes.

Genera
The following is a list of genera within the Melanconidaceae, according to the 2007 Outline of Ascomycota. The placement of Gibellia in this family is uncertain.

Botanamphora
Ceratoporthe
Cytomelanconis
Dicarpella
Dictyoporthe
Freminaevia
Gibellia
Hypophloeda
Kensinjia
Macrodiaporthe
Massariovalsa
Mebarria
Melanamphora
Melanconiella
Melanconis
Melanconium
Melogramma
Phragmodiaporthe
Plagiophiale
Plagiostigme
Prosthecium
Prostratus
Pseudovalsa
Pseudovalsella
Wehmeyera
Wuestneia
Wuestneiopsis

References

 
Ascomycota families
Diaporthales